Rapala Tournament Fishing is a fishing video game developed by Fun Labs and Magic Wand Productions and sponsored by Rapala. It was released by Activision on the Xbox 360 and Wii in November 2006 in the US and in March 2007 in the PAL region. The game received negative reviews.

Critical reaction
GameSpot awarded the game only 4.5 out of 10, criticising the unresponsive controls, unchallenging nature of the fish themselves, graphical quirks and inappropriate force feedback. However the pleasant music and inclusion of a wide variety of fishing equipment were highlighted as good features.

IGN awarded the game 3.0 out of 10 with similar criticisms, describing the gameplay as "nearly broken".

References

2006 video games
Wii games
Xbox 360 games
Activision games
Fishing video games
Video games developed in Romania
Fun Labs games
Single-player video games
Magic Wand Productions games